Sif Einarsdotter Ruud Fallde born Sif Einarsdotter Ruud (6 May 1916 – 15 August 2011), best known as Sif Ruud, was a Swedish film actress. Born in Stockholm to Einar Ruud and Inez Engström, she began her career in 1938, and appeared in 140 films. At the 15th Guldbagge Awards she won the award for Best Actress for her role in A Walk in the Sun.

Selected filmography

 Nothing Is Forgotten (1942)
 Kristin Commands (1946)
 It Rains on Our Love (1946)
 Johansson and Vestman (1946)
 How to Love (1947)
 Neglected by His Wife (1947)
 Dynamite (1947)
 Port of Call (1948)
 Girl from the Mountain Village (1948)
 On These Shoulders (1948)
 Lars Hård (1948)
 Love Wins Out (1949)
 Dangerous Spring (1949)
 Father Bom (1949)
 Thirst (1949)
 Only a Mother (1949)
 Playing Truant (1949)
 The Street (1949)
 Vagabond Blacksmiths (1949)
 To Joy (1950)
 Jack of Hearts (1950)
 Two Stories Up (1950)
 Divorced (1951)
 Encounter with Life (1952)
 Say It with Flowers (1952)
 Barabbas (1953)
 Hidden in the Fog (1953)
Taxi 13 (1954)
 Storm Over Tjurö (1954)
 The Vicious Breed (1954)
 Paradise (1955)
 Moon Over Hellesta (1956)
 The Girl in Tails (1956)
 Det är aldrig för sent (1956)
 Girls Without Rooms (1956)
 Stage Entrance (1956)
 The Stranger from the Sky (1956)
 Wild Strawberries (1957) - Aunt Olga
 Miss April (1958)
 The Magician (1958)
 Laila (1958)
 The Lady in Black (1958)
 Heaven and Pancake (1959)
 The Beloved Game (1959)
 Good Friends and Faithful Neighbours (1960)
 The Die Is Cast (1960) 
 Forelsket i København (1960)
 Summer and Sinners (1960)
 When Darkness Falls (1960)
 Lovely Is the Summer Night (1961)
 Ticket to Paradise (1962)
 The Lady in White (1962)
 Hide and Seek (1963)
 A Handful of Love (1974)
 Face to Face (1976)
 Paradise Place (1977)
 The Best Intentions (1992)

References

External links
 

1916 births
2011 deaths
Swedish film actresses
Actresses from Stockholm
Eugene O'Neill Award winners
Litteris et Artibus recipients
20th-century Swedish actresses
Best Actress Guldbagge Award winners
Best Supporting Actress Guldbagge Award winners